Iceland's first ambassador to Denmark was Sveinn Björnsson in 1920. Iceland's current ambassador to Denmark is Helga Hauksdóttir.

List of ambassadors

See also
Denmark–Iceland relations
Foreign relations of Iceland
Ambassadors of Iceland

References
List of Icelandic representatives (Icelandic Foreign Ministry website) 

Main
Denmark
Iceland